Maslam is an Afro-Asiatic language spoken in northern Cameroon, with a few in southwestern Chad.  Dialects are Maslam and Sao.  Maslam is in rapid decline.

Distribution
Maslam is spoken in Maltam. Sahu (Sao), a closely related variety, is spoken in Saho, a few kilometers to the north in southern Makari commune, and also in Goulfey and Kousseri communes in the department of Logone-et-Chari. It is also spoken in Chad. In the 1980s, there were 5,000 speakers or slightly fewer in Cameroon (ALCAM 1984).

Notes 

Biu-Mandara languages
Languages of Chad
Languages of Cameroon
Endangered Afroasiatic languages